Franco Manfroi (Forno di Canale 11 June 1939 - Belluno 12 October 2005)

Was a former Italian cross-country skier who competed in the 1960s. He earned a bronze medal in the 4 x 10 km at the 1966 FIS Nordic World Ski Championships in Oslo. He was an athlete of the G.S. Fiamme Oro.

Further notable results
 1963
 2nd, Italian men's championships of cross-country skiing, 50 km
 1964:
 3rd, Italian men's championships of cross-country skiing, 30 km
 3rd, Italian men's championships of cross-country skiing, 15 km
 1965:
 3rd, Italian men's championships of cross-country skiing, 50 km
 3rd, Italian men's championships of cross-country skiing, 30 km
 1966:
 2nd, Italian men's championships of cross-country skiing, 30 km
 3rd, Italian men's championships of cross-country skiing, 50 km
 3rd, Italian men's championships of cross-country skiing, 15 km
 1969
3rd, Italian men's championships of cross-country skiing, 30 km
 1970
3rd, Italian men's championships of cross-country skiing, 50 km
 1971
3rd, Italian men's championships of cross-country skiing, 30 km

Books 
 Dario Fontanive, Due scie nel vento, Franco Manfroi Una vita pre lo sci, Edizioni Grafisma 2007

References

External links
 
 World Championship results 
 https://web.archive.org/web/20160304023602/http://www.fondoitalia.it/personaggi/Manfroi_Franco.html 

1939 births
2005 deaths
People from Canale d'Agordo
Italian male cross-country skiers
FIS Nordic World Ski Championships medalists in cross-country skiing
Olympic cross-country skiers of Italy
Cross-country skiers at the 1964 Winter Olympics
Cross-country skiers at the 1968 Winter Olympics
Cross-country skiers of Fiamme Oro
Sportspeople from the Province of Belluno